The Dutch municipality Appingedam is divided into districts and neighbourhoods for statistical purposes. The municipality is divided into the following statistical districts:

 Wijk 00 (CBS-districtcode:000300)

A statistical district may consist of several neighbourhoods. The table below shows the neighbourhood division with characteristic values according to the Statistics Netherlands (CBS, 2008):

|}

References

Eemsdelta
Lists of neighborhoods in Dutch municipalities